Danube Gorge may refer to various gorges along the River Danube in Europe:
 Danube Gorge (Weltenburg), near Weltenburg, Bavaria, Germany
 Danube Gorge (Beuron), near Beuron, Baden-Wurttemberg, Germany
 Danube Gorge (Iron Gates), near Orsova, Romania
 Various other gorges along the Danube, see Danube